The Common Industrial Protocol (CIP) is an industrial protocol for industrial automation applications. It is supported by ODVA.

Previously known as Control and Information Protocol, CIP encompasses a comprehensive suite of messages and services for the collection of manufacturing automation applications – control, safety, synchronization, motion, configuration and information. It allows users to integrate these manufacturing applications with enterprise-level Ethernet networks and the Internet. It is supported by hundreds of vendors around the world, and is media-independent. CIP provides a unified communication architecture throughout the manufacturing enterprise. It is used in EtherNet/IP, DeviceNet, CompoNet and ControlNet.

ODVA is the organization that supports network technologies built on the Common Industrial Protocol (CIP). These also currently include application extensions to CIP: CIP Safety, CIP Motion and CIP Sync.

References

External links
 ODVA website
 EtherNet/IP: Industrial Protocol White Paper

Serial buses
Network protocols
Industrial automation